El Heraldo is a regional newspaper based in the city of Barranquilla, Colombia, founded in 1933 by Juan Fernández Ortega, Luis Eduardo Manotas Llinás, and Alberto Pumarejo Vengoechea. It is the third highest circulating newspaper in Colombia mostly covering the area of the Colombian Caribbean Region and other main cities in the country.

References

Publications established in 1933
Newspapers published in Colombia
Mass media in Barranquilla
Spanish-language newspapers